Castissent is a hamlet located in the municipality of Tremp, in Province of Lleida province, Catalonia, Spain. As of 2020, it has a population of 18.

Geography 
Castissent is located 93km north of Lleida.

References

Populated places in the Province of Lleida